Dharmapriya Dias is an actor in Sri Lankan cinema, stage drama and television. And a professional dubbing artist since 1995. Dias has titles such as playwright, actor, set designer, choreographer, teacher of art and has a master's degree in theatre and drama. He is the performing arts and sculpture art teacher in Shasthrananda Vidyalaya, Dehiwela.

Personal life
He studied at Sir Jhon Kothalawala College from grade 1 to O-Levels. He completed his education from Piliyandala Central College, where he started drama under Premakumara Karunaratne. He is married to Anoja Milanthi and the couple has two sons - Swarna Rawana and Prawara Bhashana.

Theatre career
Just after advanced level, he started to act in stage dramas. He acted in a stage play together with his fellow school leavers and the drama was selected for the final stage of Stage Drama Festival as well. His talents were polished under the direction of Sri Lanka's renowned artists such as Bandula Vithanage, K. B. Herath, Jayalath Manoratne, Rajitha Dissanayake, Thumindu Dodantenna and Chamika Hathlawaththa.

His maiden stage drama direction came through Saadaya Marai Salli Hamarai. The drama reached a box office success within two years having run more than 200 shows. The drama also won several awards at the Stage Drama Festival, 2015 for the categories of best actor, actress, and stage manager. The final show before the break was staged on 20 November 2016. The drama won the awards for Best Actor, Best Actress and Best Stage management at 2015 State Drama Festival. He won the best Set Designer Award at the stage drama festival for Daasa Mallige Bangalawa co-directed by Ruwan Malith Peris, and Kalana Gunasekara. He is also the set designer of his own productions such as: Gahanu Vada Arabathi aka Lysistrata, Sadaya Marai Salli Hamarai, Mama Nevei Vena Kenek, Julius Ceaser, as well as Jayalath Manoratne's Lokaya Thani Yayak, and Rajitha Dissanayake's plays Siriwardena Pawula, Sihina Horu Aran, Bakamuna Veedi Basi.

Notable works

 Apahu Heranna Ba
 Arundhathi
 Asinamaali
 Bakamuna Weedi Basi 
 Banku Weeraya
 Baraniya
 "Buruwa Mahaththaya"
 "Dasa Mallige Bangalawa"
 Deveni Mahindha
 Dolahak
 Guru Tharuva
 Guti Kemata Niyamithai
 Hari Apuru Dawasak 
 Hayina
 Hithala Gaththu Theeranayak
 Jayasirita Pissu
 Julius Caesar
 Kaneru Mal 
 Lysistrata(Gahanu Veda arabathi)
 Makarakshaya
 Malima Mama Newei Wena Kenek Mata Wedi Thiyan Nedda? Muhunata Muhuna Muthu Ataye Geethaya Nathuwa Bari Minihek Romaya Gini Gani Sadaya Marai Salli Hamarai Sihina Horu Aran Sihina Sappuwa Suriyamal Sukarayek Samaga
 "Vara mal"
 Vanisiye Wellenda Vasu Deva Veeraya Marila Visekariyo
 Nambu kara vilasini(Respectable Prostitute)

Short plays
 Poparmama Saha Pinthuraya
 Binduwa
 Sanda Sewannella
 Kiri Muttiya Gagegiya
Chandravathi samaga rathriyak
 Parani Malavun(Based on Franze Kafka's Short Story)

Television career
With award-winning performances in stage dramas, Dias was able to move into the television drama career with some popular serials directed by Saranga Mendis, Sudatha Rohana, Janaka Siriwardena, and Dee Gee Somapala.

Notable works

 Adisi Nadiya 
 Deweni Inima as Ananda
 Gamane Ya
 His Ahasa Yata
 Hiru Kumari
 Husma Saha Oxygen
 Ingammaruwa
 Ithin Ita Passe
 Jeewithaya Dakinna 
 Jodu Gedara
 Koombiyo as Padmakumara Kasthuri
 Lock Down Stories
 Maddahana
 Mahapolawa
 Nadagamkarayo
 Nil Ahasa Oba
 Nilla Penena Manaya 
 Oba Nisa as Pramodha Dunukebandara
 Paradeesaya 
 Pawara Menuwara
 Pini Bindu 
 Pork Veediya 
 Queen
 Rahai Jeewithe
 Ran Siri Mal
 Rantharu
 Sahodaraya
 "Uthuvan Kande Saradiyal"
 Sihina Genena Kumariye as Cyril
 Snap
 Sulanga Maha Meraka
 Three-wheel Malli

Filmography
Dias started his film career with Walapatala back in 2008, directed by Vijitha Gunarathna with a minor role. He played minor roles in Vijitha Gunaratne's Wala Patala and two other films Bora Diya Pokuna and Nahi Werena Werani. His most popular cinema acting came through films Machan, Puthandiya and Asandhimitta. The role in Machan as Stanley was highly praised by the critics and earned him the award for Best Actor.

Awards and accolades
He has won several awards at the local stage drama festivals and television festivals, for acting, direction and choreography.

Youth Drama Festival Awards

|-
|| 1996 ||| Sajeant || Best Supportive Actor || 
|-
|| 1997 ||| Sanda Sewanella || Best Supportive Actor ||

Stage Drama Festival Awards

|-
|| 2003 ||| Hayna || Best Actor || 
|-
|| 2004 ||| Dasa Mallige Bangalawa || Best Set Designer || 
|-
|| ||| Gehenu Weda Arambathi || Best Choreography || 
|-
|| 1997 ||| Popar Mama Saha Pinthuraya || Merit Award || 
|-
|| 2001 ||| Asinamaali || Merit Award || 
|-
|| 2017 ||| Nathuwa Bari Minihek || Best Actor ||

Sarasavi Awards

|-
|| 2008 ||| Machan || Best Actor ||

References

External links
 Funny Money
 මම නළුවෙක් වෙන්න හිටපු කෙනෙක් නෙවෙයි – ධර්මප්‍රිය ඩයස්

Sri Lankan male film actors
Sinhalese male actors
Living people
Sri Lankan male stage actors
Year of birth missing (living people)